Pediodectes grandis, the grand shieldback, is a species of shield-backed katydid in the family Tettigoniidae. It is found in Central America and North America.

Subspecies
These two subspecies belong to the species Pediodectes grandis:
 Pediodectes grandis grandis (Rehn, 1904)
 Pediodectes grandis insignis (Caudell, 1907)

References

Tettigoniinae
Articles created by Qbugbot
Insects described in 1904